Hristo Spasov (Bulgarian: Христо Спасов; born 13 June 1988) is a Bulgarian footballer who currently plays as a forward for Bansko.

Career
During the 2009–10 season, Spasov finished as South-West V AFG's top scorer with 28 goals for Chepinets Velingrad. In the following season he became for second time league top goalscorer with 32 goals for Lokomotiv Septemvri.

On 30 January 2012, Spasov joined Lokomotiv Plovdiv. He made his A PFG debut in a 2–1 away win over Kaliakra Kavarna on 18 March.

On 19 July 2017, Spasov joined Spartak Pleven but was released at the end of the season.

References

1988 births
Living people
Bulgarian footballers
First Professional Football League (Bulgaria) players
Second Professional Football League (Bulgaria) players
Neftochimic Burgas players
FC Hebar Pazardzhik players
PFC Lokomotiv Plovdiv players
FC Septemvri Sofia players
FC Botev Vratsa players
PFC Spartak Pleven players
FC Bansko players
Association football forwards